George Rous (c.1744 – 11 June 1802) was a British lawyer and  politician who sat in the House of Commons from 1776 to 1780.

Rous was the third son of Thomas Rous of Piercefield, Monmouthshire, and his wife Mary Bates, daughter of Thomas Bates. His father was a  director of the East India Company. Rous was probably educated at Eton College between 1756 and 1760 and matriculated at Christ Church, Oxford on 16 December 1760, aged 16.  He entered Middle Temple in 1763, transferred to Inner Temple in 1764 and was called to the bar in 1768.  He married Charlotte Thomas, daughter of Rev. Hugh Thomas, dean of Ely.

Rous was elected  Member of Parliament for Shaftesbury on the interest of Francis Sykes at a by-election on 17 May 1776. The seat had been vacant for a year following the voiding of the previous election on grounds of  “most notorious bribery and corruption”. Rous did not stand again for Shaftesbury in 1780. 
   
Rous became Counsel to the East India Company in 1781 and held the post until his death. He succeeded his brother Thomas Bates Rous in 1799 and sold his estate at Moor Park. In 1802 he became bencher of the Inner Temple. He died on 11 June 1802 and was buried at Temple Church.

References

1740s births
1802 deaths
People from Monmouthshire
Alumni of Christ Church, Oxford
Members of the Middle Temple
Members of the Inner Temple
Members of the Parliament of Great Britain for English constituencies
British MPs 1774–1780